Litoria quiritatus, the screaming tree frog, is a species of frog that lives in the dark forest of New South Wales.

Discovery 
The species was also discovered to be a different species from the bleating tree frog (Litoria dentata)..

References 

Amphibians of New South Wales
quiritatus
Frogs of Australia
Amphibians described in 2021